Valle del Fuerte Federal International Airport, commonly named Los Mochis International Airport, is the airport serving Los Mochis, Sinaloa, Mexico. It comprises a terminal building with basic services and three commercial aircraft parking spaces.

It handled 213,600 passengers in 2020, and 367,700 passengers in 2021.

Airlines and destinations

Statistics

Passengers

Busiest routes

Gallery

See also 

 List of the busiest airports in Mexico

References

External links
 Los Mochis International Airport
 Current weather at MMLM from NOAA

Airports in Sinaloa
Los Mochis